Keene is an unincorporated community in McKenzie County, North Dakota in the United States. It has the ZIP code of 58847, which includes surrounding farmland.  In this zip code area, the 2000 census found 258 people.

Climate
This climatic region is typified by large seasonal temperature differences, with warm to hot (and often humid) summers and cold (sometimes severely cold) winters.  According to the Köppen Climate Classification system, Keene has a humid continental climate, abbreviated "Dfb" on climate maps.

References

Unincorporated communities in McKenzie County, North Dakota
Unincorporated communities in North Dakota